Charmer is the fourth full-length by American indie rock band Tigers Jaw. It was released on June 3, 2014, on Run For Cover Records. Former members Adam McIlwee, Dennis Mishko and Pat Brier were included in the recording of the album despite no longer being a part of the band. In October and November 2015, the group supported New Found Glory and Yellowcard on their co-headlining US tour.

Track listing 
All songs written by Tigers Jaw.

Personnel 
Pat Brier – drums, percussion, guitar, vocals
Brianna Collins – keyboard, vocals
Adam McIlwee – guitar, vocals
Dennis Mishko – bass
Ben Walsh – guitar, vocals, drums, percussion

References

2014 albums
Run for Cover Records albums
Albums produced by Will Yip
Tigers Jaw albums